AKZ may refer to:
16
 akz, ISO language code for the Alabama language
 "AKZ", a song from the Kane & Abel album Most Wanted
 AKZ Ararat Cognac Factory, an enterprise in Ararat, Armenia